List of Women's Australian rules football leagues around the world.

Australia

National
AFL Women's - semi-professional national competition beginning in 2017

Australian Capital Territory
ACT Women's Australian Football League

New South Wales
Sydney Women's AFL

Northern Territory
Northern Territory Women's Premier League

Queensland
QAFLW & QFAW
AFL Capricornia Women's League
AFL Townsville Women's League
AFL Mackay Women's League
Youth Girls Competition

South Australia
 SANFL Women's
 South Australian Women's Football League

Tasmania
Australian rules football in Tasmania#Women.27s

Victoria
VFL Women's
 Victorian Women's Football League
AFL South East
AFL Goldfields
AFL Central Vic/AFL Goulburn Murray
AFL Gippsland
Northern Football League
Southern Football Netball League
Eastern Football League
Western Region Football League
Essendon District Football League
Victorian Amateur Football Association
AFL Barwon Women's Football

Western Australia
 WAFL Women's
 West Australian Women's Football League
 South West Football League (women's division)

Argentina
 Women's Footy Argentina

Canada
 Alberta Footy Women's League

Japan
AFL Japan Official website
Tokyo Open League
Japan Osaka Australian Football League

New Zealand
 Women's Footy NZ

Papua New Guinea
AFL PNG Official AFL PNG website

South Africa
 Women's AFL South Africa

United States of America
 United States Australian Football League Official Website
 Women's Footy News

United Kingdom
 AFL London Official Website
 Oxford Australian Rules Football Club Official Website

References

 
leagues